Umil  is a Tulu language film directed by Ranjith suvarna starring Umesh Mijar in lead role and Naveen D Padil, Aravind Bolar, Bhojaraj Vamanjoor, Chethan Rai Mani, Sathish Bandale and Deepak Rai  in prominent roles. Ravi Basrur composed the music of the movie. For the first time Kannada Actor Puneeth Rajkumar has rendered his voice for a Tulu song. The Movie was released on 7 December 2018.

The movie was produced by Karunakar Shetty and Prajnesh.

Cast 
Umesh Mijar
Naveen D Padi
Aravind Bolar
Bhojaraj Vamanjoor
Chethan Rai Mani
Sathish Bandale
Deepak Rai
Pooja shetty

References 

2018 films
Tulu-language films